Humpback dolphins are members of the genus Sousa. These dolphins are characterized by the conspicuous humps and elongated dorsal fins found on the backs of adults of the species. They are found close to shore along the coast of West Africa (Atlantic species/variety) and right along the coast of the Indian Ocean from South Africa to Australia (Indo-Pacific species/varieties). Several institutions have made a proposal to divide the Indo-Pacific species into two distinct species: the Indo-Pacific humpback dolphin and the Australian humpback dolphin.

Description
The humpback dolphin is a coastal dolphin that can be found along the coast of Africa and India south to Australia, areas differing for separate varieties.  The humpback dolphin has a hump ahead of the dorsal fin,  as well as a careen on a ventral side. The dorsal fin of the humpback dolphin is to some degree falcate.   The pectoral fins are considerably small and the tail flukes have a well-defined median notch. On each side of the jaw there are 30 to 34 small coned-shaped teeth. 

Newborn calves are a cream or pearl shade of white, much like that of an adult beluga whale, whereas the adults have a more dull off-white coloring from the tail to the snout. Their flanks are dark gray, and their stomachs are a lighter gray.

Diet
The humpback dolphin's main diet consists of mullet and other fish, though the feeding habits are widely unknown, as this animal is not widely known itself.

Taxonomy
 Genus Sousa:
 S. chinensis (Indo-Pacific humpback dolphin)
 S. plumbea (Indian Ocean humpback dolphin)
 S. teuszii (Atlantic humpback dolphin)
 S. sahulensis (Australian humpback dolphin)

By the mid-2000s, most authorities accepted just two species—the Atlantic and the Indo-Pacific. However, in his widely used systematic account, Rice identified three species, viewing the Indo-Pacific as two species named simply the Indian and Pacific. The dividing line between the two (sub)species is taken to be Sumatra, one of the Indonesian islands; however, intermixing is thought to be inevitable.

Further, Australian cetologist Graham Ross writes "However, recent morphological studies, somewhat supported equivocally by genetic analyses, indicate that there is a single, variable species for which the name S. chinensis has priority".

Humpback dolphins found in Chinese waters are locally known as Chinese white dolphins. See that article for specific issues relating to that subspecies which corresponds to the Pacific humpback dolphin in Rice's classification.

In late 2013, researchers from the Wildlife Conservation Society and the American Natural History museum proposed classification of the Indo-Pacific humpback dolphin into three species based on morphological and genetic analysis. Their research indicates that at least four species make up the genus Sousa: the Atlantic humpback dolphin (S. teuszii), two species of Indo-Pacific humpback dolphin (S. plumbea and S. chinesis), and a fourth, new species of Indo-Pacific humpback dolphin found off northern Australia, a distinction with potential to guide conservation efforts for the species.

Conservation
The species is listed on Appendix I and Appendix II of the Convention on the Conservation of Migratory Species of Wild Animals (CMS). It is listed on Appendix I as this species has been categorized as being in danger of extinction throughout all or a significant proportion of its range and CMS Parties strive towards strictly protecting these animals, conserving or restoring the places where they live, mitigating obstacles to migration and controlling other factors that might endanger them. It is listed on Appendix II as it has an unfavourable conservation status or would benefit significantly from international co-operation organised by tailored agreements.

In addition, the Atlantic humpback dolphin is covered by the Memorandum of Understanding Concerning the Conservation of the Manatee and Small Cetaceans of Western Africa and Macaronesia.

See also

List of cetacean species

References

Oceanic dolphins
Cetaceans of the Pacific Ocean
Cetaceans of the Indian Ocean
Cetaceans of the Atlantic Ocean
Marine fauna of Africa
Marine fauna of Asia
Marine fauna of Oceania
Mammals of Asia
Taxa named by John Edward Gray